Thomas E. Short Bull (born December 4, 1946) is an American former politician. He served in the South Dakota Senate from 1983 to 1988. He is a Teton Sioux.

References

1946 births
Living people
People from Fall River County, South Dakota
University of South Dakota alumni
Democratic Party members of the South Dakota House of Representatives
Democratic Party South Dakota state senators
People from Pine Ridge, South Dakota